Ardo is a male given name. People named Ardo include:
Ardo (died 720/721), Visigothic king
Ardo Ärmpalu (born 1980), Estonian basketball player
Ardo Arusaar (born 1988), Estonian wrestler
Ardo Hansson (born 1958), Estonian economist
Ardo Kreek (born 1986), Estonian volleyball player
Ardo Ojasalu (born 1964), Estonian computer engineer and politician
Ardo Rennik (1947–2009), Estonian figure skater and coach
Ardo Smaragdus (died 843), French hagiographer
Ardo Ran Varres (born 1974), Estonian actor and composer 

Estonian masculine given names